Nobuko Kawano is a Japanese athlete.  She won the gold medal in the 800 metres event in the 1974 Asian Games.

References

Athletes (track and field) at the 1974 Asian Games
Athletes (track and field) at the 1970 Asian Games
Asian Games gold medalists for Japan
Asian Games silver medalists for Japan
Asian Games bronze medalists for Japan
Asian Games medalists in athletics (track and field)
Medalists at the 1974 Asian Games
Medalists at the 1970 Asian Games
Living people
Year of birth missing (living people)